Although often characterized as apolitical, “Los Angeles has provided the setting for many important chapters in the struggle for gay and lesbian community, visibility, and civil rights." Moreover, Los Angeles' LGBT community has historically played a significant role in the development of the entertainment industry.

History

One of the first recorded mentions of male same-sex social activity in Los Angeles was at the Vienna Buffet, which from 1891–1902 was a restaurant with live music in Court Street, roughly the site of the Los Angeles City Hall today. From 1891–1902, the venue was the  where scandal occurred, as did gatherings of gay men including "she boys".

LGBT culture in Los Angeles has deep roots in the counterculture movement of the 1960s. Although San Francisco is frequently imagined to be the epicenter of the mid-century Counterculture Movement, “Los Angeles endured the countercurrents of the 1960s as much as any other city in the country [...]” More specifically, LA's Queer culture became visible and highly politicized in response to a string of violent bar raids that took place on Sunset Strip in the 60s.

The riots and protests subsequent to the raids on Sunset Strip in 1966 were preceded by a long history of violent outbursts between the Los Angeles Police Department and the public - also known as the Sunset Strip Curfew Riots. Draconian police tactics eventually led the LAPD to seek out and aggressively monitor bars with predominately gay clienteles, including the Black Cat Tavern and The Patch.

Protests reacting to these police raids - organized by P.R.I.D.E. (Personal Rights in Defense and Education) and SCCRH (Southern California Council on Religion and Homophile) - are still considered to be "the first gay protests in America to attract significant numbers," preceding the Stonewall Riots
by two years.

In addition, The Advocate - the oldest and largest LGBT publication in the nation – was created in 1967 in response to the riots on Sunset Strip as a tool to further ignite LGBT activism in LA and across state lines.

Other landmark achievements for the LGBT community in Los Angeles’ history that pre-date Stonewall include (but are not limited to):
 The establishment of the Mattachine Society – A group of “leftist men” dedicated to liberating the term, “the homosexual,” from criminal and perverse connotations through protests and manifestos.
 The creation of the ONE National Gay and Lesbian Archives and ONE magazine – “a national institution that fostered gay scholarship."          
 The establishment of “Vice Versa” – the first lesbian publication circulated in the United States.
 The Metropolitan Community Church – “the first gay and lesbian organization to publicly own property in the United States.
Contemporary examples of LGBT culture and history in Los Angeles include (but are not limited to): 
 Controversy occurred when Mitchell Grobeson, the first openly gay police officer in the Los Angeles Police Department (LAPD), later resigned, accusing the agency of mistreatment. Grobeson had been reinstated into the police force and walked in the 1994 Los Angeles pride parade in full uniform, but he stated that the management has attempted to terminate him by November 1995, so he resigned in January of that year. According to Grobeson the department did not want him to actively recruit in the LGBT community.
 The defense attorneys of O. J. Simpson referred to allegations of LAPD's homophobia during the O. J. Simpson trial in 1994.
 In 1998 there were 15 openly LGBT officers in the Los Angeles County Sheriff's Office. By 1998 the LAPD was actively hiring LGBT officers and had an LGBT community liaison.

 By 2006 the LAPD was taking steps to actively recruit LGBT persons as police officers.

Important Historical Figures

Coach Pat Nordell
Pat Nordell was born (1932) and raised in Wheaton, Illinois. She attended Wheaton Community High School in the 1950s and received her B.S. at the University of Arizona in Tucson. Later she moved to Los Angeles to pursue her coaching career. She was an important influencer in the fight for fair wages of women high school coaches in the Los Angeles Unified School District (LAUSD). In May 1981 the Federal Equal Employment Opportunity Commission sued LAUSD on behalf of Nordell and other women coaches. The women demanded back pay as far back as 3 years, a matching of salary to male coaches, and an establishing of an affirmation action program across all Los Angeles high schools. The women coaches won the suit which marked a landmark win for women's civil rights in Los Angeles.

Nordell was a well-loved coach of women's basketball and women and men's track and field for over 30 years. She was awarded various honors throughout her career such as the 1980 District Coach of the Year from the National High School Athletic Coaches Association and the 1980 Coach of the Year award from the California Coaches Association. As an openly out lesbian, Nordell lived a happy joyous life with friends and long-term partner Lee, and later Mickey (after Lee's passing). Her group of friends could be found vacationing, camping, and hosting various holiday parties throughout the year.

Martha Foster

Martha Foster was a lesbian poet and fiction writer who lived in Los Angeles, California but was originally from the east coast. Her private life is a mystery as no records of her birth or death certificate have been found, but it is assumed she lived through the 1930s to 1990s. Foster had an abusive childhood which led to her running away from her abusive mother at 21, and in a notarized letter to a family member she asked to not be found or looked for as they would not find her. One of her most notable works is Manor from Heaven co-written by her and Winifred Aydelotte.

Lesbian Love
Lesbian Love (1990) was a listener-sponsored radio station at KPFK out of North Hollywood. Radio host B. Love created content that centered lesbian lives in Los Angeles as well as Lesbian culture. She talked about spirituality, relationships, and had interviews. Because Lesbian Love was listener-centered, you could find B. Love talking with callers over the air and asking for others to join in on the conversation. B. Love was an important member of the Los Angeles lesbian community and her radio show provided a space for closeted women to partake in the community anonymously.

Jinx Beers
Jinx Beers was born in Pasadena, California in 1933 and passed away in 2018.  Beers joined the United States Air force and after receiving an honorable discharge, she went into the National Reserves for 12 years but resigned in 1974 due to the anti-gay military policies. In the Los Angeles area, she was a prominent activist and scholar. She was the founder and editor of the Lesbian News which successfully ran for about 10 in the 1970s. Other important works by Beers were Memoirs of an Old Dyke (2009) as well as her numerous poetry and non-fiction short writings.

Ester F. Bentley
Ester F. Bentley (1915-2004) was an advocate for lesbian, gay, and women's rights throughout her life. In the 1940s during the war years, she worked closely with war workers and their families. Her worked heavily connected Catholic ministries and gay and lesbian organizations to bridge the gap that exist between both communities. Her work was important because religion and the LGBTQ community are of often at odds with each other, but with her strong catholic background, social work career, and activism, Bentley made a significant impact in Los Angeles.  Bentley was also a founding member of the Coalition of Older Lesbians (COOL).

Important Historical Organizations

Old Lesbians Organizing for Change
Old Lesbians Organizing for Change (OLOC) is an organization of lesbians 60 years of age and older that works towards tackling critical issues impacting the aging LGBTQ community. Their goal is to undo ageism, sexism, and racism and build community empowerment through educational programming, national conferences, socials, and action. They are a national organization that started in 1987 and is still currently running.

Connexxus Women's Center/Centro de Mujeres
Connexxus Women's Center/Centro de Mujeres was one of the first lesbian and women centered non-profit organizations that focused on supporting the holistic wellness and professionalization of the lesbian community. They first opened their doors in January 1985 and had a fairly successful until its closing in June 1990. Connexxus was successful in creating opportunities, such as opening your business, for women's’ professional development through their economic empowerment program. They provided a variety of mental health services such as 1-on-1 counseling and support groups and community wide conferences for service providers. Another strong component of the organization was their community events to facilitate socializing and community building.

ACT UP/LA
ACT UP/LA was founded December 1987 and disbanded 10 years later in 1997. ACT UP/LA was a powerful activist force in Los Angeles during the AIDS pandemic. They worked tirelessly to fight for accessible healthcare the HIV+ community, destigmatize stereotypes towards them, and provide information and education about existing services. ACT UP/LA was unique because it also had a Woman's Caucus that had strong male allies. The caucus centered the needs of women affected by HIV and Aids and coordinated their own actions and education.

Southern California Women for Understanding
Southern California Women for Understanding (SCWU) was one of the first lesbian non-profit educational organizations in Los Angeles, California. SCWU was the brainchild of Betty Berzon, a former Board member of the Whitman-Radclyffe Foundation (WRF). Betty Berzon recruited local lesbian activists to be on the board: Myra Riddell  (Chairperson), Terry DeCresenzo (Vice-Chairperson), Sue Philbrick (Secretary), Karen Weiss (Treasurer), Betty Berzon (Ex-Officio, Liaison to the Board). Pat Berlly, Gloria Muetzel, Irene Robertson, Jane Patterson, and Barbara Colby comprised the remaining voting committee members. Southern California Women, a chapter WFR, began in 1976, as a social group for gay women that hosted general membership meetings, special interest discussion groups, and social gatherings. During an administrative upheaval of WRF in 1978, Southern California Women divorced from WRF and became the Southern California for Understanding. Throughout their time different chapters popped up beyond the Los Angeles area, such as San Gabriel and Orange County in California

The goal of SCWU was twofold. One, was to disseminate accurate information about lesbians and lesbian culture to disrupt the stereotypes and myths the media perpetuated about lesbians. They believed that tackling these misconceptions would decrease and ultimately stop the hostility and discrimination against gay and lesbians in different facets of their life. Second, they sought to meet the needs of career women who had to remain closeted. They hosted a variety of anonymous socials and events hosted in the private residence of members who offered their space to sustain anonymity of these women.
 
Other work of SCWU consisted of supporting local and statewide politicians and media outlets whose political alignments supported the lesbian and gay community. They often joined local actions coordinated by gay organizations in Los Angeles and statewide. Most of this type of work was undertaken by out lesbians, or those who were able to navigate outness and anonymity in their life.

The social that SCWU hosted varied from educational workshops, skill building activities, and dances, to name a few. Some of their most popular events were the Speakers Bureau Panelist with local lesbian,  “Canines, Lovers, & Felines too” workshop, Oldies but Goodies Night and Disco Dance, Outreach at the Beach, and camping weekends.

Lesbian Nurses of Los Angeles
Lesbian Nurses of Los Angeles (LNLA) was formed in July 1985. It is “a support and professional group to Registered Nurses who share in common: being a woman; being a feminist; being a lesbian.” They provide support for each other through problem solving, identity based referrals to resources, and knowledge sharing. An important aspect of their meetings is consciousness-raising of political and social issues affecting lesbians, feminists, and nurses. They mission and goals inspired collaborations with other community organizations that fought against homophobia and discrimination, a prime example the Southern California Women for Understanding. They would meet biweekly at the homes of their members which created a sense of community and chosen family for the women who may otherwise not have that in their personal life. A unique aspect of their work is they worked to support nurses who were dealing with grievances in their workplace due to discrimination based on their sexual orientation but also advocated and support their lesbian and gay clients who were accessing healthcare.

Lesbian Visibility Week

Lesbian Visibility Week was an event from July 8 to 15, 1990-1992 organized by the Lesbian and Gay Advisory Council in West Hollywood. It was one of the first major events in Los Angeles, California that highlighted the lesbian community. Throughout the week they hosted art shows, plays, a film festival, picnics, and even a dog show.

Los Angeles Women's Community Chorus

The Los Angeles Women's Community Chorus (LAWCC) was a Los Angeles, California based non-profit group from 1976 to 1990 and performed works written and arranged by women. The LAWCC used their platform to bring awareness about lesbian issues, feminism, and other local issues affecting the gay and lesbian community.  The chorus had a steady and consistent group of around 80 women on any given year. These women committed for at least a year and spent numerous hours practicing to develop a professional and talented rapport in Los Angeles and beyond. The LAWCC performed was asked to in a variety of venues such as universities, prisons, conventions, and local union and organizing meetings. An important aspect of their work was being intentional about the community accessing their performances. Their events tended to be sliding scale or donation based, provided childcare, offered Spanish translations and signing for the hearing impaired, and offering braille song books for the blind. The foresight of this non-profit to make their performances accessible for the gay and lesbian community and other Los Angeles communities speaks to their mission of using performance art as a tool for change.

Gay and Lesbian Community Service Center
The Gay and Lesbian Community Service Center (GLCSC), currently known as the Los Angeles Lesbian Gay Bisexual and Transgender Center, was established in 1972 by the Los Angeles Gay Liberation Front and the Metropolitan Community Church.  Much like today, the GLCSC focused on providing human services for the local gay and lesbian community, especially housing services due to the dire housing crisis at the time. One important program they ran was the Gay and Lesbian Youth Talk Line, an anonymous service for youth to connect with the community and local resources. Other services were the Community Outreach and Education project, RAPS, quarterly newsletters, workshops, social outings, safer sex projects and two important ones, the Women's Law Project and HIV Law Project.

Demographics
According to one study in 2007, 3.7% of adults in Los Angeles County identified as lesbian, gay, or bisexual. By race, the percentages were 5% of whites, 4% of African-Americans, and 2.8% of Latinos.

Geography
The City of West Hollywood is the thriving core of the LGBT community and nightlife, and as of 2014 its population was about 40% LGBT. It had the nickname "Gay Camelot." In addition it is known as "Boys Town". LGBT businesses opened in West Hollywood because it was under the jurisdiction of the Los Angeles County Sheriff's Department; the Los Angeles Police Department had a reputation of raiding LGBT businesses. In addition the presence of the design community also attracted LGBT culture. It was affected by AIDS in the 1980s. By 2014, as LGBT individuals had faced increasing acceptance in society, the city's identity has slowly shifted from being exclusively LGBT.

Today, “West Hollywood symbolizes gay and lesbian political strength.”  However, “the labeling of the area as ‘the gay city’ by locals and the media carries multiple meanings, not all of them positive." As a result, LGBT folks continue to debate West Hollywood's role as the political, cultural, and social center of the community.

Another LGBT community is located in Silver Lake, Los Angeles. There are large numbers of LGBT residents of Venice, Los Angeles and the City of Santa Monica. Other communities with LGBT residents include Elysian Park, Hollywood, North Hollywood, Reseda, Sherman Oaks, Studio City, and Van Nuys. Areas outside of the City of Los Angeles with LGBT residents include Laguna Beach and Riverside.

Night life
Bars were the “primary social institution of homosexual life after WWII." They provided places for queer folks to meet friends and find potential partners. Moreover, queer bars in LA were considered to be the most public aspect of homosexual life in the mid-20th century: The spaces themselves helped shape burgeoning individual and collective identities. However, the newfound visibility of gay bars frequently led to violent raids by the Los Angeles Police Department. In fact, “In 1969 alone the Los Angeles Police Department made 3,858 arrests under the category of crime it used to persecute homosexuals."

Moreover, the police raids and subsequent protests at The Black Cat Tavern and The Patch in 1967 are often credited with igniting the mainstream LGBT Movement (prior to the protests at Stonewall). In honor of the Los Angeles LGBT community, The Black Cat Tavern was deemed a “Historical-Cultural” monument by the Los Angeles City Planning Department in 2008.

Other noteworthy gay bars in Los Angeles include:
Los Globos in Silver Lake
Jewel's Catch One

Circus of Books was a bookstore and gay pornography shop in West Hollywood that was notable as a gay cruising spot of the late 20th Century.

Politics
LGBT participation in city politics began in the 1980s. In 1993 5% of the Los Angeles voters identified as gay or lesbian.

During the mayoral elections, Tom Bradley was elected due to support from a left-leaning coalition that included LGBT groups. The 1992 Los Angeles Riots caused the coalition to disintegrate. In 1993, Michael Woo, who was a member of the Los Angeles City Council, was the preferred choice since Bradley did not seek re-election as Mayor of Los Angeles. Woo got 40% of the votes from those who identified as gay or lesbian, compared to a third candidate who received 27% and Richard Riordan, who received 11%. In the runoff election, Woo received 72% of the votes from those who identified as gay and lesbian. In 1997, Tom Hayden, a member of the Senate of California, had received 54% of the gay and lesbian vote while Riordan had 41%. The lesbian and gay voters and the African-American blocs were the only ones that voted over 50% in favor of Hayden, and Hayden had made strong efforts to attract gay and lesbian votes.

Institutions

The Los Angeles LGBT Center is in the community.

Ethnic LGBT+ orgnizations based in Los Angeles include GALAS LGBTQ+ Armenian Society, RAHA International and Satrang.

The ONE National Gay & Lesbian Archives at the University of Southern California holds LGBT-related archival materials. It maintains an archives and museum in West Hollywood.

The Gay Women's Service Center, the first U.S. social center for lesbians, was founded in 1971.

Harry Hay established the Mattachine Society in Los Angeles in 1950; the organization moved its headquarters from to San Francisco in the 1950s.

From 1992 to 2004, the EAGLES Academy was located in Hollywood. It was the first public high school designed for LGBT youth from grade 7 onwards in the United States.

Jaja Muhammad of the BBC described the bookshop Circus of Books, with locations in West Hollywood and Silverlake as the most famous Los Angeles book retailer focusing on LGBT-centric pornography in the pre-internet era. It was called Book Circus until its new owners renamed it in 1982. In 2016 and 2019 the latter and former closed, respectively. Muhammad stated "it was a refuge and a meeting place for LA's gay community".

Media
ONE Magazine, the first U.S.-wide LGBT publication, was established in Los Angeles.

The popular Logo gay reality series RuPaul's Drag Race is based in Los Angeles.

L.A. Gay Pride
The Los Angeles gay pride parade and festival is a large event held every June in West Hollywood.  L.A. gay pride annually attract over 400,000 people.

Notable residents

Rose Greene (1946–2019), financial planner and activist
Lorri Jean, executive director of LGBT Center
Ray Navarro (1964–1990), artist, filmmaker, and HIV/AIDS activist
Torie Osborn, activist and political figure
Ben J. Pierce (1999–), YouTuber, singer-songwriter, and actor

See also
Gay Men's Chorus of Los Angeles
At The Beach LA
The Celluloid Closet
Dirty Looks (non-profit)

References
 Moore, Mignon R. "Black and Gay in L.A.: The Relationships Black Lesbians and Gay Men Have to Their Racial and Religious Communities" (Chapter 7). In: Hunt, Darnell and Ana-Christina Ramon (editors). Black Los Angeles: American Dreams and Racial Realities. NYU Press, April 19, 2010. , 9780814773062.
 Roots of Equality (Tom De Simone, Teresa Wang, Melissa Lopez, Diem Tran, Andy Sacher). Lavender Los Angeles. Arcadia Publishing, 2011. , 9780738574905.

Notes

Further reading
 Faderman, Lillian and Stuart Timmons. Gay L.A.: A History of Sexual Outlaws, Power Politics, and Lipstick Lesbians. Basic Books, 2006. , 9780465022885.
 Kenney, Moira. Mapping Gay L.A.: The Intersection of Place and Politics (American Subjects). Temple University Press, 2001. , 9781566398848.
 Outtraveler Contributor. "THE Lesbian Guide to West Hollywood" (Archive). OUT Traveler. July 26, 2013.

External links
 Los Angeles LGBT Center
 Los Angeles Gay Tourism
 Official guide to West Hollywood
 Equality California